The Hungerburgbahn is a hybrid funicular railway in Innsbruck, Austria, connecting the city district of Hungerburg with the city centre. The current line opened on 1 December 2007, replacing a previous alignment that operated from 1906 to 2005. The new Hungerburgbahn is one of the landmarks of the city, with stations designed by Zaha Hadid, and built by Leitner AG.

Current Line 

The new Hungerburgbahn was put into operation in December 2007, after two years of construction. The renowned architect Zaha Hadid, who had already planned the Bergisel ski jump in Innsbruck, won an open competition to design the stations for the line. The project was financed and implemented as a public private partnership between the city of Innsbruck, STRABAG and Leitner AG. The company will operate the train for a limited time, after which the infrastructure and operations return to the municipality.

The new Hungerburgbahn is unusual for a funicular in that, although it does not reach the maximum gradient of its former incarnation, it experiences rapidly changing inclination both during the course of the route and at the various stops, transitioning between a relatively flat southern section (with ramps leading in and out of the two tunnels on either side of the river crossing), and a steeply inclined northern section more typical of a funicular.

The line is single-tracked except for a passing loop at the midpoint. At the lower end, the route begins underground at Kongresshaus station at the eastern end of the Kongresshaus (a conference and concert venue) in the city centre, then runs beneath local streets in a 371.5 m long single-track tunnel before surfacing immediately south of Löwenhaus intermediate station. The line crosses the Inn on a 242 m long S-shaped cable-stayed steel bridge with two pylons, follows the north bank of the river in the St. Nikolaus neighbourhood, then descends into the 445 m long Weiherburg tunnel. The tunnel includes the midpoint of the route, and thus the passing loop. North of the passing loop, and while still in the tunnel, the line changes character from the relatively level southern portion, to the steeply inclined northern portion. The line rises sharply from the tunnel and follows a curved alignment, stopping at the Alpenzoo intermediate station, and crossing a 462 m long reinforced concrete bridge. The new route joins the old route for the final 100 m of the ascent to the upper terminus at Hungerburg station.

The line is mainly used for tourism, including from the Kongresshaus adjacent to the eponymous Kongresshaus station, and from the Nordkette ski area, which is accessible via the Nordkette Cable Car from the square opposite Hungerburg station. The line has relatively lower utility as a commuting route, as its upper station is located at the far eastern end of the Hungerburg district, away from most housing estates. At the lower end, the line terminates in an area containing the Kongresshaus convention centre, parking garages, bus parking, and part of the University of Innsbruck grounds. However, it is isolated by over 800 m from Innsbruck Hauptbahnhof, the city's main railway station, with the gap bridged by city bus lines.

The city of Innsbruck finances additional off-peak hours, and normal transport network core zone tickets (monthly, half-yearly and annual) are accepted as valid payment.

Vehicles 

Given the extreme change in gradient between the southern and northern sections of the line, Leitner AG designed the line's two funicular cars to each hold five smaller passenger compartments, suspended in a common frame. The inclination of these compartments is actively adjusted by a motor along the course of the route such that the floors remain horizontal throughout the trip. The two 130-person vehicles each have a transport capacity of 1,200 people per hour and direction. 

The outer frames of both cars are painted silver. The five individual compartments of Car No. 1 are painted yellow, while those of Car No. 2 are painted blue.

Controversy 
The decision by city leadership to implement the new project was the object of heavy criticism by citizens' initiatives and the city's political opposition. A referendum on the future of the Hungerburgbahn had been demanded by a variety of groups opposed to the project, but the demand was not met. The formerly historically listed railway was to be preserved as a symbol of the city of Innsbruck just a few weeks before its 100th anniversary of service, and last-minute demolition was to be prevented. There was also criticism of the planned de facto privatization of the railway as part of the new construction project and associated fears that fares could rise significantly.

As a result of the controversy, the groundbreaking for the new rail project had to be carried out under police protection. December 8, 2005 was abruptly set as the last day of operation of the old Hungerburgbahn, with staff forbidden from holding hold farewell celebrations or from informing the public about the end of operations.

Snow issues 

The design of the roof of the station at Hungerburg is such that snow can enter the station, resulting in its partial closure after snow falls.

Former Line 
The Hungerburg district was founded by Sebastian Kandler at the turn of the 20th century as a tourist centre. The first Hungerburgbahn was developed by engineer Joseph Riehl to serve the new district, and entered service on September 12, 1906. Together with the Nordkette Cable Car, the Hungerburgbahn opened up the Nordkette (including Seegrube and the Hafelekar) to skiing and other recreational use, and additionally provided public transport from the higher residential areas of the Hungerburg to the city centre.

From there the line ascended steeply, crossing the river on a sloped steel truss bridge, and proceeding on a straight alignment up to the Hungerburg district.

With the original AC motor from 1906, the journey took 11 minutes, and 300 people could be transported per hour.

On July 31, 1987, Alpenzoo Station was opened to serve the nearby Alpine zoo. This stop was slightly below the midpoint of the route, meaning that while the lower car served the station, the higher car (being attached to the same cable) was forced to wait above the passing loop.

The “Talstation” cultural centre and event space (literally translated, "Valley Station") occupy the building. In addition to office and seminar rooms for young Innsbruck clubs and initiatives, it also offers a bar, a band room and a photo laboratory. The former departure hall has been converted into an event hall that can hold 250 people, and is used for theatre, concerts, discussions and film lectures.

Both bridges are heritage listed. Most of the track systems have now been dismantled and the rest of the former route has largely grown over, but is still clearly visible.

Images

References

External links 
 
 The Hungerburgbahn at the Gondola Project
 
 
 
 

Funicular railways in Austria
Transport in Innsbruck